Zachariah Anani (25 December 1958 – 4 July 2016, Arabic: زكريا عناني, also Zack or Zak) was a Sunni Muslim citizen of Lebanon who later converted to Christianity and settled in Canada in 1996. He described himself as a former militia fighter.

Biography
Anani was born in Beirut and claimed descent "from a long line of imams" and that he was "expected to become one at the age of 14." Anani says that he became a fighter in a Lebanese militia and "at the age of 14."

Anani claimed to have been trained to fight and kill Jews and to hate Christians and Americans. He said his family was pleased with his decision because they believe Islamic teachings promise reaching heaven if he were to die in battle against "unbelievers." Ironically, Anani said that he faced Muslim groups, who fought among themselves and usually Israelis only once.

He was later to meet an American Southern Baptist missionary, who inspired him to convert to Christianity, and later moved to Canada.

Anani was a naturalized citizen of Canada. He lived in Windsor, Ontario.

Anani had a controversial a career as a public speak on Islam in the 2000s. He has been described as part of the counter-jihad movement.

Anani was included in the manifesto of extremist Norwegian Anders Behring Breivik in a section against the Council on American-Islamic Relations for criticizing Anani's views.

Controversies
Anani attracted criticism with talks such as a 2007 lecture at Campbell Baptist Church in Windsor, Ontario, The Deadly Threat of Islam in which he characterized Islam a faith that worships a god who "fights and kills," "strikes with terror," and forbids the taking of prisoners in battles against nonbelievers.

Anani was one of a number of converts to Christianity who are public critics of Islam, including Ergun Caner, Walid Shoebat, and Mark A. Gabriel, who have been accused of inflating or inventing details of their life before conversion to Christianity.

See also
 Nonie Darwish

References

Counter-jihad activists
Lebanese Baptists
Lebanese emigrants to Canada
People from Beirut
Former Muslim critics of Islam
Canadian former Muslims
1958 births
2016 deaths
Canadian critics of Islam
20th-century Baptists